J.P.M.M. (Jan) Hendrikx (born 17 July 1944) is a former Dutch politician. He is a member of the Christian Democratic Appeal (Christen-Democratisch Appèl). From 1990 to 2012, he was mayor of the municipality of Baarle-Nassau. Previously he was an alderman of the municipality of Someren. Both municipalities are situated in the province of North Brabant.

References 
  Mayor Jan Hendrikx, Baarle-Nassau website

1944 births
Living people
Aldermen in North Brabant
People from Someren
Christian Democratic Appeal politicians
Mayors in North Brabant
People from Baarle-Nassau